Mamoutou Danfaga (born 12 May 1990) is a retired Malian football midfielder who plays for AS Police.

References

1990 births
Living people
People from Kayes
Malian footballers
Mali international footballers
CS Duguwolofila players
Association football midfielders
21st-century Malian people